Simply Believe is the fourteenth studio album by Welsh singer Bonnie Tyler. It was released on 13 April 2004 by Yanis Records.

The singles from Simply Believe were the two French duets with Kareen Antonn, both originally released as solo singles by Tyler years before. Their first duet, "Si demain... (Turn Around)", was a success, and reached number one in  France for ten weeks and became the fourth best-selling single in France in 2004. Eight of the tracks on the album were also released by her then-future record company, Stick Music, on an EP called Bonnie Tyler in 2005. Critical reception of Simply Believe was mostly positive, with the album being regarded as Tyler's "comeback".

Background 
After the release of Heart Strings in the previous year, Tyler had begun working on a new album. While getting plans together, French singer Kareen Antonn wrote to Tyler asking if she would be willing to record a bilingual version of "Total Eclipse of the Heart" as a duet with her. Though hesitant, Tyler requested a demo recording of Antonn singing the song in French. Impressed by what she received, Tyler accepted and flew to Paris to record the song. They later recorded a new version of "It's a Heartache" in the same format.

Simply Believe only contains six original songs. Tyler recorded new versions of "Holding Out for a Hero", "Here She Comes", "If You Were a Woman (And I Was a Man)", as well as two tracks from her 1995 Free Spirit album; "All Night to Know You" and "Driving Me Wild".

Promotion

Singles 
The lead single from Simply Believe was released long before the album, due to popular demand from the public. Tyler explained to BBC News that even the single was released three weeks earlier than planned "after people heard it on the radio and went into the shops trying to buy it." "Si demain..." was released on 22 December 2003, in France. The single reached number one in France and remained there for ten weeks running through 2004, and became the fourth best-selling single that year in France. It also gave Tyler the record of the longest time gap between top ten singles in France. Eighteen years passed between her hit "If You Were a Woman (And I Was a Man)" which reached number six in 1986, and the release of "Si demain...".

Following the success of the single, Simply Believe was released on 13 April 2004. Tyler and Antonn's second duet, "Si tout s'arrête (It' a Heartache)", was released on 7 June 2004 as a follow-up to their first release. It peaked at number 12 in the French singles chart soon after.

Track listing

Notes
  French adaptation of lyrics

Critical reception

The album received a three and a half star review from Rob Theakston of Allmusic. He said that Tyler was "still in fine form two decades (after her musical heyday) later" and that Simply Believe should "satisfy die-hard fans".

Charts

Year End charts

Personnel 
Credits adapted from liner notes, and YouTube Music.

 Bonnie Tyler – lead vocals
 Frédéric Andrews – keyboards, organ, programming
 Oliver Fox – keyboards
 Benoit Souris – organ
 John Stage – keyboards, bass, backing vocals
 Sébastien Heurtault – guitars
 Kamil Rustam – guitars
 Tom Box – drums
 Guillaume Duval – harmonica
 Kareen Antonn – lead vocals , backing vocals
 Bethanee Bishop – backing vocals
 Mélanie Ducret – backing vocals
 Floriane Godebout – backing vocals
 Delphine Goury – backing vocals
 Fanny Llado – backing vocals
 Jean-Nicolas Sombrun – backing vocals

Production
 Lynda Ramdane – executive producer
 Faouze Barkati – producer
 Krem Barkati – producer
 Wallid Barkati – producer
 Jean Lahcene – engineer 
 Bertrand Levet – photography 
 Pascal Ratthe – photography 
 Nicolas Sautiez – photography

References

2004 albums
Bonnie Tyler albums
Sony Music albums